Reggie Travon Gilliam (born August 20, 1997) is an American football fullback for the Buffalo Bills of the National Football League (NFL). He played college football at Toledo, and has played professionally as a fullback, though he spent the 2020 season as a tight end.

Early life and high school
Gilliam grew up in Columbus, Ohio and attended Westland High School in Galloway, Ohio. As a senior, he rushed for 565 yards and eight touchdowns on 87 carries and had 18 catches for 280 yards and three touchdowns and was named first-team All-Ohio Capital Conference Central Division.

College career
Gilliam was a member of the Toledo Rockets for four seasons, joining the team as a walk-on and playing tight end on offense and fullback on special teams. He led the nation with four blocked kicks as a junior in 2018 and was named second-team All-Mid-American Conference. Gilliam finished his collegiate career with 18 receptions for 153 yards and three touchdowns with six blocked kicks.

Professional career
Gilliam was signed by the Buffalo Bills as an undrafted free agent on April 25, 2020. He made the Bills' 53-man roster out of training camp. Gilliam made his NFL debut in the Bills' season opener against the New York Jets on September 13, 2020. The following week on September 20, 2020, Gilliam caught a one-yard touchdown pass from Josh Allen for his first career reception in a 31-28 win over the Miami Dolphins.

On August 7, 2022, Gilliam signed a two-year, $5.2 million contract extension with the Bills.

NFL career statistics

Regular season

Postseason

References

External links
Toledo Rockets bio
Buffalo Bills bio

1997 births
Living people
American football tight ends
Toledo Rockets football players
Buffalo Bills players
Players of American football from Columbus, Ohio
American football fullbacks